Kufri ,  is a village Union Council (administrative subdivisions) of Khushab District in the Punjab Province of Pakistan. The Name of village Kufri has been changed in 2009. The new name of the village is now Siddiqabad , (on the name of Siddiq-e-Akbar). The village has been located on the verge of main Naushera- Sakesar Road. The population is demographically divided into four portions.

References

External links
 About

Union councils of Khushab District
Populated places in Khushab District